Days and Nights in Wuhan (Chinese: 武汉日夜) is a 2021 propaganda documentary film detailing the COVID-19 pandemic in Wuhan, Hubei, China. The film was directed by Cao Jinling, and co-produced by the Chinese Communist Party and the Hubei Propaganda Department. Days and Nights in Wuhan was released in China on January 22, 2021. It is unknown if there are plans to release the film outside of China.

Days and Nights in Wuhan features a song titled "You Are So Kind" by Chinese actress and singer Zhou Xun.

References

External links 
 
 Days and Nights in Wuhan at Douban (Chinese-language page).

2021 films
2021 documentary films
Chinese documentary films
Chinese propaganda films
Documentary films about the COVID-19 pandemic
COVID-19 pandemic in mainland China
History of Wuhan
Health in Hubei